List of battles fought by the Old Swiss Confederacy, 1315–1799.

The Battle of Morgarten of 1315 is famous as the first military success of the Confederacy, but it was an ambush on an army on the march rather than an open field battle.
The Battle of Laupen of 1339 is an early battle which can be seen as indicating the trend of the dominance of infantry over heavy cavalry during the Late Middle Ages.

The classical period of military successes of Swiss halberd and pike warfare Pike square (in de Gevierthaufen or Gewalthaufen) are the wars of the Eight Cantons (Ten Cantons after 1481) during the 1360s to 1490s.  Most notable among these are the Battle of Sempach (1386), the Burgundian Wars (1470s) and the Swabian War (1499).

The string of Swiss victories is broken in the early 16th century, and after a few painful defeats (notably at Marignano 1515), the Confederacy stopped its aggressive expansion. The early modern period is characterized by internal disputes, both religious and social (peasant uprisings).
The final French invasion of Switzerland was only marginally a military operation and mostly a collapse due to centrifugal forces within the Confederacy.

Early Confederacy (1315–1351)

Eight Cantons (1353–1477)

Ten Cantons (1481–1500)

Thirteen Cantons (1512–1540)

Early Modern conflicts (1550–1712)
After their defeats in Italy, the Confederacy pledged neutrality and did not engage in further warfare beyond its borders. For the remaining duration of the Old Swiss Confederacy 1540–1798, armed conflicts were internal, either between factions within the confederacy, or peasant uprisings). Also listed are conflicts between associates of the Confederacy (Three Leagues, Geneva) with neighbouring powers even if the Confederacy itself was not involved.

French invasion (1798)

These are minor skirmishes on 2–5 March 1798, leading to the swift collapse of the Old Confederacy, the clashes of April and May last pockets of resistance against the recently established Helvetic Republic. The Nidwalden uprising (Schreckenstage von Nidwalden) in September was more serious, with 435 dead, including 118 women and 25 children.
The 1799 conflict in the Valais was not a "Battle of the Old Swiss Confederacy" in the narrow sense, as Valais was not a member of the Old Confederacy. The Valais formed the separate Rhodanic Republic in 1802 and joined the restored Swiss Confederacy only in 1815.

See also 
 Military history of Switzerland
 Growth of the Old Swiss Confederacy
 List of battles 1301–1600
 List of battles 1601–1800

Battles
Swiss Confederacy